Euphorbia hirta (sometimes called asthma-plant) is a pantropical weed, originating from the tropical regions of the Americas. It is a hairy herb that grows in open grasslands, roadsides and pathways. It is widely used in traditional herbal medicine across many cultures, particularly for asthma, skin ailments, and hypertension. It is also consumed in herbal tea form as folk medicine for fevers in the Philippines (where it is known as tawa-tawa), particularly for dengue fever and malaria.

Botany

There are stipules present. The leaves are simple, elliptical, hairy (on both upper and lower surfaces but particularly on the veins on the lower leaf surface), with a finely dentate margin. Leaves occur in opposite pairs on the stem. The flowers are unisexual and found in axillary cymes at each leaf node. They lack petals and are generally on a stalk. The fruit is a capsules with three valves and produces tiny, oblong, four-sided red seeds. It has a white or brown taproot.

References

Further reading

External links
PROTA4U: Euphorbia hirta

hirta
Flora of North America
Flora of South America
Medicinal plants of Asia
Plants described in 1753
Taxa named by Carl Linnaeus
Pantropical flora